
Gmina Regnów is a rural gmina (administrative district) in Rawa County, Łódź Voivodeship, in central Poland.

Villages
Gmina Regnów contains the villages and settlements of Annosław, Kazimierzów, Nowy Regnów, Podskarbice Królewskie, Podskarbice Szlacheckie, Regnów, Rylsk, Rylsk Duży, Rylsk Mały, Sławków, Sowidół and Wólka Strońska.

Neighbouring gminas
Gmina Regnów is bordered by the gminas of Biała Rawska, Cielądz, Rawa Mazowiecka and Sadkowice.

References
Polish official population figures 2006

Regnow
Rawa County